Olton & West Warwickshire Hockey Club (Olton & West Warwick for short) is a field hockey club based at the West Warwickshire Sports Club in Grange Road, Olton, Solihull, West Midlands. The club runs a large number of teams featuring men's, women's, juniors and veteran sides.

Olton & West Warwicks men's first X1 play in the Men's England Hockey League Division One North. and the women's first X1 play in the England Hockey League Investec Conference West.

The women's team has gained significant honours -
 2001-02 National League Runner-Up
 2008-09 National League Runner-up
 2001-02 Premiership Tournament Champions
 2000-01 Cup Runner-Up
 2001-02 Cup Runner-Up

References

English field hockey clubs